St. Mary Magdalene Church of Kawit, also known as Kawit Church is the parish church of the municipality of Kawit, Cavite in the Philippines.  The Roman Catholic church is one of the oldest churches in the Philippines, construction of the present church was started in 1737.  The church, named after Jesus' disciple Mary Magdalene, was last restored in 1990 by the citizens of Kawit.

Emilio Aguinaldo, the president of the First Philippine Republic was baptized in this church, his birth certificate is kept on the left side of the altar.  The church is known for healing and resolution to personal problems.  The current parish priest of the church is Rev. Fr. Andy Manaog.

St. Mary Magdalene's statue

The miraculous life-size image of Mary Magdalene in Kawit has a "mark" in the middle of her forehead, it resembles a mole and no living local in Kawit knows why the statue has such a mark. Speculations suggests that this is the symbolic mark of Jesus' fingertip during the resurrection when he had appeared to Magdalene and said Noli me tangere (Touch me not) as it was recorded in the Gospel of John 20:17. Some suggests that this mark is to clearly distinguish her identity from the Virgin Mary.

The antique statue is a detailed wooden sculpture with carved hair, draped clothing and a pair of silver shoes, she holds a crucifix on her left hand and a jar of perfume on the right hand. Her detailed carved clothing is a mixture of pink, orange, gold and a hint of light green beneath the orange draping.  This detailed wardrobe is not usually seen because, by tradition, the image is always clothed with a gown, usually red in color with gold embroideries and orange, yellow or golden cape. A long wig that reaches to the hem of the gown is also placed on top of her carved hair.  Three yellow strips of ribbon (or sash) is pinned horizontally to her gown to secure the wig from being displaced, and at the bottom, a pocket catches the ends of her wig. Only the face and hands are repainted from time to time, and the rest of the image's original paint is untouched.

History
The Jesuits first came to Kawit in 1624 to spread Christianity.  The first wooden church was constructed in 1638 through the help of six Filipino families from the towns of Maragondon and Silang, Cavite. The town of Kawit, which was formerly known as Cavite Viejo during Spanish occupation, was frequented by Spanish marines, which slowly turned the town into a "red-light district".  To help solve the bad reputation of the place, Manila Archbishop Miguel Garcia Serrano (1618–1629) ordered the dedication of the Kawit Church to St. Mary Magdalene, who became the patroness of the town. Some people and researchers believe that it is possible that she may not be the original patron saint of the town, since most of the old parishes in Cavite were consecrated to the Virgin Mary.

In 1737, the cornerstones of the present church were placed and the construction of the stone church began. The roof of the church were destroyed by a strong typhoon in 1831.  The control of the church was transferred to the secular clergy in 1768 after the expulsion of the Jesuits from all of the Spanish Colony.  The church was placed then under the Recollects in 1849.  In 1869, General Emilio Aguinaldo, the president of the First Philippine Republic was baptized in this church. His birth certificate is kept inside a glass cabinet and on the left side of the altar, where the miraculous life-size (original) statue of St. Mary Magdalene is enshrined.

During the Philippine–American War in 1898, the Kawit Church was almost destroyed by Philippine forces who bombarded it using a pair of 8-inch muzzle loading cannon, belonging to the Philippine San Roque Battery under the command of an American, L.M. Johnson (Who would be mentioned in the Philippine Declaration of Independence) on the orders of Emilio Aguinaldo. The Spanish forces surrendered.  Later in the war it was bombarded by the Americans as Filipino leaders were hiding in the church for protection.  Scars from the damages suffered by the building can still be traced on the church's exterior. The church was soon repaired after.

Through the concerted efforts of the Kawiteños, the church was renovated and restored in 1990 through the leadership of Fr. Luciano Paguiligan.

Physical features
The years have tinted the church's facade with a characteristic patina, prevalent in the brick walls, making the plastered cornices and pilasters that divide the facade stand out to the eye. The facade is otherwise devoid of any flamboyant decorative elements.
The first level is marked off by pilasters into vertical bays. The arched main portal dominates the center of the facade, topped by the seal of the church's patroness represented by two capital letter M's. Rectangular windows line the second level. The pediment features a central niche which enshrines a smaller statue of Saint Mary Magdalene.

A four-story bell tower is on the right side of the facade and its lower levels are square. These levels have windows on every side. The topmost level is narrower and octagonal. All of the bell tower's top windows have arched windows marked by 'ventanilla' latticework below the sills. The belfry is capped by a metal dome which is topped by a weather vane.

The plan of the church is a cruciform with a single nave.  The sides of the church have a total of 14 sets of windows each with a small stained-glass depicting the fourteen Stations of the Cross. Below each window is arch-shaped windows for air circulation.  The two sides of the main altar, each have a larger stained-glass windows - one depicts the Resurrection of Christ and the other the life of Jesus Christ at different stages of his life.

Vicariate of St. Mary Magdalene
The Vicariate of St. Mary Magdalene of the Diocese of Imus celebrated its Golden Jubilee in November 2011.  The Vicar Forane of the vicariate is Rev Fr. Teodoro B. Bawalan with Rev. Fr. Cornelio L. Matanguihan as the Vicarial representative.  Under the vicariate are the following parishes:
Nuestra Senora de la Soledad Parish (Our Lady of Solitude Parish) – Villa Cañacao, Sta. Isabel, Kawit
Our Lady of Fatima Parish – Samala-Marquez, Binakayan, Kawit
San Antonio de Padua Parish – San Antonio, Cavite City
San Pedro Apostol Parish – San Pedro, Cavite City
San Roque Parish (Shrine of Nuestra Señora de la Soledad de Porta Vaga) – San Roque, Cavite City (Jubilee Church)
St. Mary Magdalene Parish – Kawit Proper (Jubilee Church)
The Holy Cross Parish – Noveleta

Marked historical structure

The St. Mary Magdalene Church was declared a Historical Structure of the Philippines and a marker was placed by the National Historical Institute (now called the National Historical Commission of the Philippines in 1990.

In popular media
The church was featured in different films and commercials:
 The music video "Tell The World of His Love", produced for the World Youth Day in 1995, was filmed in the interiors of the church with actress Sharon Cuneta. 
 The 2002 film I Think I'm in Love starring Joyce Jimenez and Piolo Pascual was filmed on both the interior and exterior parts of the church. The movie was directed by Maryo J. Delos Reyes.
 The wedding scene of Emilio Aguinaldo and his second wife Maria Agoncillo in the 2012 biographical film on the life of Emilio Aguinaldo, El Presidente, was filmed inside the church.

See also
List of Cultural Properties of the Philippines in CALABARZON

References

 Galende, Pedro G. Philippine Church Facades. Quezon City: Filipiniana.net, 2007.
 Layug, Benjamin L. A Tourist Guide to Notable Philippine Churches. Quezon City: New Day Publication, 2007.

External links

  St. Mary Magdalene Parish from Visit my Philippines
 St. Mary Magdalene Parish from Cavite info

Roman Catholic churches in Cavite
Kawit, Cavite
Marked Historical Structures of the Philippines
Baroque church buildings in the Philippines
Baroque architecture in the Philippines
Churches in the Roman Catholic Diocese of Imus